Maksim Potapov (born 25 May 1980) is a Russian former professional ice hockey player who most recently played for the Nippon Paper Cranes in the Asia League Ice Hockey. He previously played extensively in the Kontinental Hockey League (KHL).

External links

1980 births
Living people
Detroit Vipers players
Johnstown Chiefs players
Atlant Moscow Oblast players
HC Spartak Moscow players
Lokomotiv Yaroslavl players
Molot-Prikamye Perm players
Torpedo Nizhny Novgorod players
Russian ice hockey left wingers
Place of birth missing (living people)
Sherbrooke Castors players
Sherbrooke Faucons players
Nippon Paper Cranes players
Sportspeople from Voronezh